The following highways are numbered 853:

United States